Bình Lục is a rural district of Hà Nam province in the Red River Delta region of Vietnam. As of 2003 the district had a population of 158,023. The district covers an area of 155 km2. The district capital lies at Bình Mỹ.   Bình Lục is where scientists excavated 6 Đông Sơn drums such as Ngọc Lũ drum, Vũ Bị drum and An Lão drum. Bình Lục is where Nguyễn Khuyến's father was born.

References

Districts of Hà Nam province